The 1991 Critérium du Dauphiné Libéré was the 43rd edition of the cycle race and was held from 3 June to 10 June 1991. The race started in Chamonix and finished in Aix-les-Bains. The race was won by Luis Herrera of the Postobón team.

Teams
Sixteen teams, containing a total of 128 riders, participated in the race:

 
 
 
 
 
 
 
 
 
 
 
 
 Tonton Tapis–GB

Route

General classification

References

Further reading

1991
1991 in French sport
June 1991 sports events in Europe